All the Right Moves is a 1983 American sports drama film directed by Michael Chapman and starring Tom Cruise, Craig T. Nelson, Lea Thompson, Chris Penn, and Gary Graham. It was filmed on location  in Johnstown, Pennsylvania, and Pittsburgh.

Plot 
Stefen "Stef" Djordjevic is a Serbian American high school defensive back who is gifted in sports and is a B student academically. He is seeking a college football scholarship to escape the economically depressed small Western Pennsylvania town of Ampipe and a dead-end job and life working at the mill, just like his grandfather, father, and his brother Greg. He dreams of becoming an electrical engineer right after he graduates from college. Ampipe is a company town whose economy is dominated by the town's main employer, American Pipe & Steel, a steel mill struggling through the downturn of the early 1980s recession. Stef gets through his days with the love of his girlfriend, Lisa Lietzke, and his strong bond with his teammates.

In the big football game against the undefeated Walnut Heights High School, Ampipe appears headed to win the game, when a fumbled handoff in the closing seconds, along with Stefen's pass interference penalty earlier in the game, lead to Walnut Heights' victory. Following the game, Coach Vern Nickerson lambastes the fumbler in the locker room, telling him he "quit" the game. When Stefen retorts that the coach himself quit, the coach kicks him off the team.

In the aftermath, disgruntled Ampipe fans vandalize Coach Nickerson's house and yard. Stefen is present and is a reluctant participant, but is nonetheless spotted by Nickerson as the vandals flee. From there, Stefen deals with personal battles, including dealing with the coach blackballing him among colleges because of his attitude and participation in the vandalism. Stefen gets in an argument with Lisa, and his best friend Brian declines a scholarship offer to USC and plans to marry his pregnant girlfriend.

Frustrated by what Nickerson did, Stefen angrily confronts his former coach which ends in a shouting match out in the street. Lisa decides to talk to Nickerson's wife to try to help. Nickerson realizes he was wrong for blackballing Stefen. He has accepted a coaching position on the West Coast at Cal Poly San Luis Obispo and offers Stefen a full scholarship to play football there, which he accepts.

Cast 
 Tom Cruise as Stefen Djordjevic
 Craig T. Nelson as Coach Vern Nickerson
 Lea Thompson as Lisa Lietzke
 Charles Cioffi as Pop
 Gary Graham as Greg Djordjevic
 Paul Carafotes as Vinnie Salvucci
 Chris Penn as Brian Riley
 Leon as Austin "Shadow" Williams
 Sandy Faison as Suzie Nickerson
 James A. Baffico as Bosko
 Mel Winkler as Jess Covington
 Terry O'Quinn as Freeman Smith

Production
The film was produced by Stephen Deutsch, with Phillip Goldfarb as co-producer. Gary Morton of Lucille Ball Productions was executive producer.  The production was filmed over seven weeks in Johnstown, Pennsylvania, in the early spring The recently closed sixty-year-old high school, the former campus of Greater Johnstown High School, was used as the location of the film, along with  Actress Thompson was inserted as a new student at Ferndale Area High School for three days prior to  Cruise was similarly inserted into Greater Johnstown High School, but was recognized immediately. (His only notable film part at the time was in Taps in 1981; The Outsiders and Risky Business were yet to be released.)

In 2018, Thompson stated she initially did not want the part, as the script required her to participate in two nude scenes, but Cruise persuaded the producers to drop one of the scenes and was naked with her in the remaining scene.

Reception
The film was released to mixed reviews. It has a score of 63% on the review aggregator website Rotten Tomatoes based on 24 reviews. The website's consensus reads, "All the Right Moves is an uncommonly grim coming-of-age drama that overcomes numerous clichés with its realistic approach to its characters and setting." On Metacritic, it has a score of 62 out of 100 based on seven reviews, indicating "generally favorable reviews".

Jay Carr from The Boston Globe stated "Cruise is believable as an athlete," and Janet Maslin of The New York Times called it "a well-made but sugar-coated working-class fable about a football star." 
Roger Ebert of the Chicago Sun-Times gave it 3 out of 4 and wrote: "Two people finally tell each other the truth. This is, of course, an astonishing breakthrough in movies about teenagers, and All the Right Moves deserves it."

Among the unfavorable reviews, TV Guide called the movie "cliché-riddled" and criticized director Michael Chapman for not taking any risks. Richard Corliss of Time called it a "naive little movie (that) hopes to prove itself the Flashdance of football."

References

External links

 
 
 

1980s sports drama films
1983 films
20th Century Fox films
American coming-of-age drama films
American romantic drama films
American teen romance films
Serbian-American culture
Films directed by Michael Chapman
Films set in Pennsylvania
Films shot in Pennsylvania
High school football films
1980s high school films
1983 directorial debut films
1983 drama films
1980s English-language films
1980s American films